"Sirens" is a song by the American rock band Pearl Jam. It was released on September 18, 2013 as a digital download as the second single from their tenth studio album Lightning Bolt. In its first week of release, the single sold 13,000 downloads in the US. Guitarist Mike McCready said the song was inspired by Roger Waters's The Wall Live Tour, when after attending a concert in 2011, he "wanted to write something that would have a Pink Floyd type feel". The lyrics by singer Eddie Vedder concern his worries on mortality and what the future holds for the next generation.

Music video
The music video directed by Danny Clinch was released on September 18, 2013.

Charts

Weekly charts

Year-end charts

Release history

References

External links

2013 singles
2013 songs
Pearl Jam songs
Song recordings produced by Brendan O'Brien (record producer)
Monkeywrench Records singles
Songs written by Eddie Vedder